William Robert Bucknell  (April 1, 1811 – March 5, 1890), was an American real estate investor, businessman, philanthropist, and benefactor to Bucknell University.

Early life
Bucknell was born in Marcus Hook, Pennsylvania to English immigrants.  His father was a Lincolnshire farmer, carpenter, and early settler of Delaware County, Pennsylvania.  He had intermittent schooling and was trained as a wood carver.

Career
Bucknell began his career as a wood carver, acquired some savings from that trade and set himself up in business.  After his first marriage, Bucknell began conducting real estate transactions with the purchase of suburban lands and the erection of buildings.

Bucknell invested in laying gas lines in the city of Chester, Pennsylvania.  He founded the Chester Gas Company in 1856.  Bucknell became a director in the United Gas Improvement Company of Philadelphia.  Bucknell was also a director in the Buffalo Gas Light Company.

In his later years, Bucknell ran a brokerage business in Philadelphia trading in securities and real estate.  Bucknell had a large ownership in The Cleveland & Pittsburgh Railroad, The Philadelphia & Reading Railroad, The United Railroads of New Jersey and various coal and iron mines.

Bucknell Mansion
Bucknell built an Italianate brownstone mansion at the corner of 17th and Walnut Streets in Philadelphia circa 1860. The building was demolished in 1907 and replaced with the Latham Hotel.

Philanthropy

Bucknell University
In 1882, Bucknell donated $50,000 to University at Lewisburg when it was experiencing financial troubles.  In 1886 the university changed its name from the University at Lewisburg to Bucknell University in his honor.

Baptist Organizations
Bucknell was a generous donor to the Upland Baptist Church in Upland, Pennsylvania.  He was also a member and major contributor to the First Baptist Church in Philadelphia.  Bucknell helped fund the erection of The Baptist Publication House in Philadelphia. He also established the Rangoon Mission in India and paid the expenses of ten missionaries in India for several years.

Pearl Hall

Bucknell sponsored the building of Pearl Hall, a serpentine stone library built on the campus of the Crozer Theological Seminary, in memory of his late wife, Margaret Crozer, daughter of textile manufacturer John Price Crozer.  In addition to the $30,000 cost of the building, Bucknell also gave $25,000 for the cost of books and $10,000 for an endowment fund. Pearl Hall formally opened on June 4, 1871. Pearl Hall is currently part of the campus of the Crozer-Chester Medical Center.

Personal life

Bucknell married Harriet Burr Ashton  (1815-1851), in 1836 and had five children, Lavinia Louisa (b. 1840), William Ashton (b. 1842), William Rufus Babcock (b. 1847), Sarah (b. 1849), and Harriet (b. 1851).

After the death of his first wife, he married Margaret Knowles Crozer (1827-1870). After Margaret's death in 1870 he married for a third time, to Emma Eliza Ward (1852-1927) in 1871. They would have four children, Howard (1874-1962), Margaret Crozer (1876-1963, who married Count Daniele Pecorini), Gertrude (1877-1936, who married Jay Gould Day) and Edith Louise (1880-1944, who married Samuel Price Wetherill, Jr.).

Bucknell's widow, Emma, was a survivor of the sinking of the RMS Titanic in 1912.

Bucknell is interred at the Woodlands Cemetery in Philadelphia.

References

1811 births
1890 deaths
19th-century American businesspeople
19th-century American philanthropists
American people of English descent
American real estate businesspeople
Bucknell University people
Burials at The Woodlands Cemetery
Businesspeople from Pennsylvania
People from Marcus Hook, Pennsylvania
Philanthropists from Pennsylvania